This is a list of 221 species in Setodes, a genus of long-horned caddisflies in the family Leptoceridae.

Setodes species

 Setodes abbreviatus Scudder, 1890 i c g
 Setodes abhichobhita Schmid, 1987 i c g
 Setodes abhirakta Schmid, 1987 i c g
 Setodes abhiramika Schmid, 1987 i c g
 Setodes abhirupa Schmid, 1987 i c g
 Setodes abhrayita Schmid, 1987 i c g
 Setodes acchidra Schmid, 1987 i c g
 Setodes acutus Navás, 1936 i c g
 Setodes adusita Schmid, 1987 i c g
 Setodes aethiopicus Kimmins, 1963 i c g
 Setodes affinis Jacquemart, 1961 i c g
 Setodes agarhita Schmid, 1987 i c g
 Setodes akalanka Schmid, 1987 i c g
 Setodes akchepana Schmid, 1987 i c g
 Setodes akilbicha Schmid, 1987 i c g
 Setodes akrura Gordon & Schmid in Schmid, 1987 i c g
 Setodes akunchita Schmid, 1987 i c g
 Setodes akutila Schmid, 1987 i c g
 Setodes akutsita Schmid, 1987 i c g
 Setodes alalus Mosely, 1948 i c g
 Setodes alampata Schmid, 1987 i c g
 Setodes alukcha Schmid, 1987 i c g
 Setodes amurensis Martynov, 1935 i c g
 Setodes anatolicus Schmid, 1964 i c g
 Setodes ancala Yang & Morse, 1989 i c g
 Setodes angulatus Chen & Morce g
 Setodes antardhana Schmid, 1987 i c g
 Setodes aparimeya Schmid, 1987 i c g
 Setodes apinchanga Schmid, 1987 i c g
 Setodes apitayati Schmid, 1987 i c g
 Setodes arenatus Holzenthal, 1982 i c g
 Setodes argentatus Matsumura, 1906 i c g
 Setodes argentiferus McLachlan, 1871 i c g
 Setodes argentiguttatus Gordon & Schmid, 1987 i c g
 Setodes argentipunctellus McLachlan, 1877 i c g
 Setodes argentivarius Kimmins, 1963 i c g
 Setodes argentoaureus Ulmer, 1915 i c g
 Setodes asadharana Schmid, 1987 i c g
 Setodes asammuaddha Schmid, 1987 i c g
 Setodes atiguna Schmid, 1987 i c g
 Setodes atiloma Schmid, 1987 i c g
 Setodes atipunya Schmid, 1987 i c g
 Setodes atisubhaga Schmid, 1987 i c g
 Setodes atitejas Schmid, 1987 i c g
 Setodes atymanjula Schmid, 1987 i c g
 Setodes atyutkata Schmid, 1987 i c g
 Setodes aureomicans Schmid, 1987 i c g
 Setodes aureonitens Schmid, 1987 i c g
 Setodes baccatus Kimmins, 1957 i c g
 Setodes barnardi Scott, 1961 i c g
 Setodes bhimachringa Schmid, 1987 i c g
 Setodes bispinus Yang & Morse, 1989 i c g
 Setodes bracteatus Neboiss, 1982 i c g
 Setodes brevicaudatus Yang & Morse, 1989 i c g
 Setodes bulgaricus Kumanski & Malicky, 1976 i c g
 Setodes carinatus Yang & Morse, 1989 i c g
 Setodes chandrakita Schmid, 1987 i c g
 Setodes chandravarna Schmid, 1987 i c g
 Setodes cheni Yang & Morse, 2000 i c g
 Setodes chlorinus Yang & Morse, 1997 i c g
 Setodes chrysoplitis Mey, 1998 i c g
 Setodes chubhamyu Schmid, 1987 i c g
 Setodes crossotus Martynov, 1935 i c g
 Setodes curvisetus Kobayashi, 1959 i c g
 Setodes dantavarna Schmid, 1987 i c g
 Setodes dehensurae Cakin & Malicky, 1983 i c g
 Setodes dhanavriddha Schmid, 1987 i c g
 Setodes dhanika Schmid, 1987 i c g
 Setodes dissobolus Mey, 1998 i c g
 Setodes distinctus Yang & Morse, 1989 i c g
 Setodes diversus Yang & Morse, 1989 i c g
 Setodes divyarupa Schmid, 1987 i c g
 Setodes dixiensis Holzenthal, 1982 i c g
 Setodes drangianicus Schmid, 1959 i c g
 Setodes dundoensis Marlier, 1965 i c g
 Setodes egregius Mey, 1998 i c g
 Setodes ekachringa Schmid, 1987 i c g
 Setodes ekapita Schmid, 1987 i c g
 Setodes endymion Malicky & Chantaramongkol in Malicky, 2000 i c g
 Setodes epicampes Edwards, 1956 i c g
 Setodes excisus Kimmins, 1956 i c g
 Setodes exposita Kimmins, 1963 i c g
 Setodes falcatus Ulmer, 1930 i c g
 Setodes flagellatus Gibbs, 1973 i c g
 Setodes flavipennis Banks, 1937 i c g
 Setodes fluvialis Kimmins, 1963 i c g
 Setodes fluviovivens Mey, 1989 i c g
 Setodes forcipatus Kimmins, 1963 i c g
 Setodes fragilis Olah, 1985 i c g
 Setodes furcatulus Martynov, 1935 i c g
 Setodes furcatus Navás, 1932 i c g
 Setodes gangaja Gordon & Schmid, 1987 i c g
 Setodes gaurichachringa Schmid, 1987 i c g
 Setodes geminispinus Yang & Morse, 2000 i c g
 Setodes gherni Schmid, 1987 i c g
 Setodes gona Mosely, 1939 i c g
 Setodes guptapara Malicky, 1979 i c g
 Setodes gutika Schmid, 1987 i c g
 Setodes gutivriddha Schmid, 1987 i c g
 Setodes guttatus (Banks, 1900) i c g
 Setodes gyrosus Yang & Morse, 2000 i c g
 Setodes hainanensis Yang & Morse, 1989 i c g
 Setodes himaruna Schmid, 1987 i c g
 Setodes holocercus Navas, 1923 i c g
 Setodes hungaricus Ulmer, 1908 i c g
 Setodes ifugella Mey, 1995 i c g
 Setodes incertus (Walker, 1852) i c g b
 Setodes iris Hagen, 1858 i c g
 Setodes jatisampanna Schmid, 1987 i c g
 Setodes kadrava Schmid, 1987 i c g
 Setodes kalyana Schmid, 1987 i c g
 Setodes kantyamrita Schmid, 1987 i c g
 Setodes kapchajalaja Schmid, 1987 i c g
 Setodes karnyi Ulmer, 1930 i c g
 Setodes khechara Schmid, 1987 i c g
 Setodes kimminsi Jacquemart, 1961 i c g
 Setodes klakahanus Ulmer, 1951 i c g
 Setodes kuehbandneri Malicky in Sipahiler & Malicky, 1987 i c g
 Setodes kugleri Botosaneanu & Gasith, 1971 i c g
 Setodes kumara Schmid, 1987 i c g
 Setodes lamellatus Yang & Morse, 2000 i c g
 Setodes lineatus Banks, 1913 i c g
 Setodes longicaudatus Yang & Morse, 1989 i c g
 Setodes madhuvarna Schmid, 1987 i c g
 Setodes mahabichu Schmid, 1987 i c g
 Setodes manimekhala Schmid, 1987 i c g
 Setodes manivriddha Schmid, 1987 i c g
 Setodes martini Navas, 1933 i c g
 Setodes mauktikavriddha Schmid, 1987 i c g
 Setodes meghavarna Schmid, 1987 i c g
 Setodes miloi Gibon, 1986 i c g
 Setodes minutus Tsuda, 1942 i c g
 Setodes monicae Schmid, 1987 i c g
 Setodes muglaensis Sipahiler, 1989 i c g
 Setodes nagarjouna Schmid, 1961 i c g
 Setodes navanita Schmid, 1987 i c g
 Setodes nigroochraceus Mosely, 1951 i c g
 Setodes nirmala Schmid, 1987 i c g
 Setodes niveogrammicus Schmid, 1987 i c g
 Setodes niveolineatus Kimmins, 1962 i c g
 Setodes njala Kimmins, 1962 i c g
 Setodes nyuna Schmid, 1987 i c g
 Setodes obscurus Schmid & Levanidova, 1986 i c g
 Setodes oligius (Ross, 1938) i c g
 Setodes orthocladus Yang & Morse, 2000 i c g
 Setodes oxapius (Ross, 1938) i c g
 Setodes paghbahani Mey, 1995 i c g
 Setodes pallidus Kimmins, 1963 i c g
 Setodes pandara Schmid, 1987 i c g
 Setodes papuanus Kimmins, 1962 i c g
 Setodes paribhuchita Schmid, 1987 i c g
 Setodes parichkrita Schmid, 1987 i c g
 Setodes parilaghu Schmid, 1987 i c g
 Setodes parisamchuddha Schmid, 1987 i c g
 Setodes pellucidulus Schmid, 1987 i c g
 Setodes peniculus Yang & Morse, 2000 i c g
 Setodes perpendicularis Chen & Morce g
 Setodes platecladus Yang & Morse, 2000 i c g
 Setodes prabhatajalaja Schmid, 1987 i c g
 Setodes pratachandradynti Schmid, 1987 i c g
 Setodes priyadarcha Schmid, 1987 i c g
 Setodes puchkaraja Schmid, 1987 i c g
 Setodes pulcher Martynov, 1910 i c g
 Setodes punctatus (Fabricius, 1793) i c g
 Setodes puruchringa Schmid, 1987 i c g
 Setodes quadratus Yang & Morse, 1989 i c g
 Setodes reclinatus Yang & Morse, 2000 i c g
 Setodes retinaculus Marlier, 1965 i c g
 Setodes sachrika Schmid, 1987 i c g
 Setodes salweenensis  g
 Setodes samphulla Schmid, 1987 i c g
 Setodes samprabhinna Schmid, 1987 i c g
 Setodes sarvapunya Schmid, 1987 i c g
 Setodes satichaya Schmid, 1987 i c g
 Setodes savibhrama Schmid, 1987 i c g
 Setodes schmidi Yang & Morse, 1989 i c g
 Setodes scleroideus Yang & Morse, 2000 i c g
 Setodes shirasensis Kobayashi, 1984 i c g
 Setodes sinuatus Yang & Morse, 2000 i c g
 Setodes siribumrungsukhai  g
 Setodes spineus Yang & Morse, 2000 i c g
 Setodes spinosellus Ulmer, 1930 i c g
 Setodes squamosus Mosely, 1931 i c g
 Setodes stehri (Ross, 1941) i c g
 Setodes sternalis Martynov, 1936 i c g
 Setodes subhachita Schmid, 1987 i c g
 Setodes sucharu Schmid, 1987 i c g
 Setodes sugdeni Malicky, 1986 i c g
 Setodes supattra Schmid, 1987 i c g
 Setodes sypharus Yang & Morse, 2000 i c g
 Setodes tarpaka Gordon & Schmid, 1987 i c g
 Setodes tcharurupa Schmid, 1987 i c g
 Setodes tchaturdanta Schmid, 1987 i c g
 Setodes tectorius Yang & Morse, 2000 i c g
 Setodes tejasvin Schmid, 1987 i c g
 Setodes tenuifalcatus Martynov, 1936 i c g
 Setodes terminalis Banks, 1920 i c g
 Setodes tilakita Schmid, 1987 i c g
 Setodes transvaalensis (Jacquemart, 1963) i c g
 Setodes tridanta Schmid, 1987 i c g
 Setodes trifidus Kimmins, 1957 i c g
 Setodes trikantayudha Schmid, 1987 i c g
 Setodes trilobatus Yang & Morse, 1989 i c g
 Setodes uchita Schmid, 1987 i c g
 Setodes uddharcha Schmid, 1987 i c g
 Setodes udghona Schmid, 1987 i c g
 Setodes ujiensis (Akagi, 1960) i c
 Setodes uncinatus Ulmer, 1913 i c g
 Setodes urania Navas, 1916 i c g
 Setodes uttamavarna Schmid, 1987 i c g
 Setodes varians Yang & Morse, 2000 i c g
 Setodes vartianorum Malicky, 1986 i c g
 Setodes venustus Ulmer, 1951 i c g
 Setodes vichitrita Schmid, 1987 i c g
 Setodes viridellus Navás, 1932 i c g
 Setodes viridis (Fourcroy, 1785) i c g
 Setodes vitanka Schmid, 1987 i c g
 Setodes vratachakora Schmid, 1987 i c g
 Setodes yatharupa Schmid, 1987 i c g
 Setodes yunnanensis Yang & Morse, 1989 i c g
 Setodes zerroukii Dakki, 1981 i c g

Data sources: i = ITIS, c = Catalogue of Life, g = GBIF, b = Bugguide.net

References

Setodes
Articles created by Qbugbot